Shade Gap Feed and Flour Mill, also known as C.J. Hess Mill, is a historic grist mill located at Dublin Township in Huntingdon County, Pennsylvania. It sits on a rubble stone foundation and has clapboard siding. The mill ceased operation in 1973–74, but continues as a livestock feed mill.

It was listed on the National Register of Historic Places in 1990.

References

External links
 millpictures.com

Grinding mills on the National Register of Historic Places in Pennsylvania
Industrial buildings completed in 1846
Buildings and structures in Huntingdon County, Pennsylvania
Grinding mills in Pennsylvania
National Register of Historic Places in Huntingdon County, Pennsylvania
1846 establishments in Pennsylvania